Take Care of Ulla (Swedish: Ta hand om Ulla) is a 1942 Swedish drama film directed by Ivar Johansson and starring Marianne Aminoff, Bengt Logardt and Åke Grönberg. The film's sets were designed by the art director Bertil Duroj.

Main cast
 Marianne Aminoff as 	Ulla Lundin
 Bengt Logardt as 	Gunnar Bergendahl
 Åke Grönberg as 	Bigge Berglund
 Claes Thelander as 	Göran Hessler
 Nils Lundell as Lundgren
 Vera Lindby as 	Sonja
 Greta Liming as Gun Larsson

References

Bibliography 
 Qvist, Per Olov & von Bagh, Peter. Guide to the Cinema of Sweden and Finland. Greenwood Publishing Group, 2000.

External links 
 

1942 films
Swedish drama films
1942 drama films
1940s Swedish-language films
Films directed by Ivar Johansson
Swedish black-and-white films
1940s Swedish films